Patrick Chauvel (born 1949 in France) is an independent war photographer whose career began when he was just 17 years old.

He has covered more than twenty conflicts all over the world, including the Six-Day War and the Vietnam War. In 1995 he was awarded the World Press Photo commendation for Spot News Stories for his coverage of the Battle of Grozny during the First Chechen War.

He is also author of some documentary movies.

On 21 December 1989 during the Invasion of Panama he was critically wounded to the belly by two rounds shot by Marines; Juan Antonio Rodriguez (El Pais) was killed.

After the death of Diana, Princess of Wales, he allegedly saw time stamped photographs from a speed camera showing the Mercedes entering the fatal tunnel.

Author of two books in French, the autobiographical Rapporteur de Guerre (2003) and the novel Sky (2005).

Also participated in 24h.com-neo media projects and in the Condition One project.

Documentary Films

 48h à Ramallah / Patrick Chauvel
 Cauchemars d’enfants tchétchènes / Patrick Chauvel
 Derrière l’objectif / Patrick Chauvel
 Kamikaze 47 / Patrick Chauvel
 Rapporteurs de guerres / Patrick Chauvel; Antoine Novat

Publications

Filmography (actor) 
 1982 : L'Honneur d'un capitaine, by Pierre Schoendoerffer
 1992 : Dien Bien Phu, by Pierre Schoendoerffer
 2004 : Le Petit Lieutenant, by Xavier Beauvois
 2004 : Above the Clouds (Là-haut, un roi au-dessus des nuages), by Pierre Schoendoerffer
 2007 :  L'étoile du soldat, by Christophe de Ponfilly

References

Further reading

1949 births
Living people
French war correspondents
French photojournalists
French documentary film directors
French male film actors